Mohammad Aliabadi (born 2 December 1956 in Arak) is former Vice President and Head of Physical Education Organization of Iran. He was also President of the National Olympic Committee of Islamic Republic of Iran from 2008 to 2014.

References

Heads of Physical Education Organization
Living people
1956 births
People from Arak, Iran